The Mod Squad is an American crime drama series, originally broadcast for five seasons on ABC from September 24, 1968, to March 1, 1973. It starred Michael Cole as Peter "Pete" Cochran, Peggy Lipton as Julie Barnes, Clarence Williams III as Lincoln "Linc" Hayes, and Tige Andrews as Captain Adam Greer. The executive producers of the series were Aaron Spelling and Danny Thomas.

The counterculture police series earned six Emmy Award nominations, four Golden Globe nominations plus one win for Peggy Lipton, one Directors Guild of America Award, and four Logies. In 1970, the second-season episode, "In This Corner . . . Sol Alpert," script by Rita Lakin and Harve Bennet, was nominated by the Mystery Writers of America for an Edgar Award in the category of Best Mystery Teleplay, losing to the TV-Movie Daughter of the Mind.  In 1997, a 1970 episode "Mother of Sorrow" was ranked #95 on TV Guide's 100 Greatest Episodes of All Time.

Plot

They were The Mod Squad ("One black, one white, one blonde"), described by one critic as "the hippest and first young undercover cops on TV". Each of these characters represented mainstream culture's principal fears regarding youth in the era: long-haired rebel Pete Cochran (Cole) was evicted from his wealthy parents's Beverly Hills home, then arrested and put on probation after he stole a car; Lincoln Hayes (Williams), who came from a family of 13 children, was arrested in the Watts riots, one of the longest and most violent riots in Los Angeles history; flower child Julie Barnes (Lipton), the "canary with a broken wing," was arrested for vagrancy after running away from her prostitute mother's San Francisco home; and Captain Adam Greer (Andrews) was a tough but sympathetic mentor and father figure who convinced them to form the squad.

The concept was to take three rebellious, disaffected young social outcasts and convince them to work as unarmed undercover detectives as an alternative to being incarcerated. Their youthful, hippie personas would enable them to get close to the criminals they would investigate. "The times are changing," Captain Greer explained. "They can get into places we (the regular police) can't." Examples included their infiltrations of a high school to solve a teacher's murder, of an underground newspaper to find a bomber, and of an acting class to look for a strangler who was preying on blonde actresses.

More than a year before the release of the film Easy Rider, The Mod Squad was one of the earliest attempts to deal with the counterculture. Groundbreaking in the realm of socially relevant drama, it dealt with issues such as abortion, domestic violence, child abuse, illiteracy, slumlords, the anti-war movement, illegal immigration, police brutality, student protest, sex education, soldiers returning from Vietnam and PTSD, racism, euthanasia, and the illegal drug trade. Spelling intended the show to be about the characters's relationships, and he promised that the Squad "would never arrest kids...or carry a gun or use one."

The show was loosely based on creator Bud "Buddy" Ruskin's experiences in the late 1950s as a squad leader for young undercover narcotics cops, though it took almost 10 years after he wrote a script for the idea to be green-lighted by ABC Television Studios.

Impact
The shows Star Trek (1966–69), I Spy (1965–68), The Bill Cosby Show (1969–71), Room 222 (1969–74), Mannix (1967–75), Mission: Impossible (1966–73), Julia (1968–71), The Flip Wilson Show (1970–74), and The Mod Squad (1968–73) were among the first programs to feature African-Americans as stars since the stereotyped roles of Amos 'n' Andy and Beulah (ABC, 1950–53). Significantly, The Mod Squad presented an African-American character (Linc) as being on an equal footing, as roles went, to the Caucasian characters (Barnes and Cochran). In one Mod Squad episode, the script called for Linc to give Barnes a "friendly kiss". Since the first interracial kiss on an American television show was in 1968, this was still fairly new territory in popular culture. The studio was frightened of a negative public reaction, so they asked Spelling to cut it:

"You can't do that," I was told. "You can't have a black man kissing a white girl." I won and ABC agreed to let it in, but they warned me I'd receive thousands of complaint letters. I didn't get one.

Linc's famous "solid" and "keep the faith" were among the current-day slang used on the show, which included "pad", "dig it", and "groovy."

The "kids" traveled in Pete's famous "Woody", an old green 1950 Mercury Woodie station wagon, until it burned up in a fire after going over a cliff during a chase at the end of the second-season episode "The Death of Wild Bill Hannachek".

Among the series guest stars were Spelling's ex-wife Carolyn Jones, Leslie Nielsen, William Windom, Ed Asner (three episodes in three different roles), Vincent Price, Sammy Davis Jr. (three episodes in three different roles), Andy Griffith, Joe Don Baker, David Cassidy, Richard Pryor, Lee Grant, Richard Dreyfuss (two episodes in two different roles), Jo Van Fleet, Tom Bosley, Marion Ross, Danny Thomas (as well as being co-executive producer of the show), Tyne Daly (two episodes in two different roles), Anthony Geary, Sam Elliott, Martin Sheen, Desi Arnaz Jr., René Auberjonois, Stefanie Powers, Robert Reed, Cesar Romero, Meg Foster (two episodes in two different roles), Jack Cassidy, Tony Dow, Vic Tayback, Fritz Weaver, Harrison Ford (uncredited role), Clint Howard, Louis Gossett Jr., Sugar Ray Robinson, Bobby Sherman (two episodes in two different roles), Billy Dee Williams, Victor Buono, Jim Backus, Fernando Lamas, Cleavon Little, Daniel J. Travanti (three episodes in three different roles), Barbara McNair and Rodolfo Hoyos, Jr. (three episodes in three different roles).

Episodes

Broadcast history and Nielsen ratings

Syndication
In the U.S., MeTV reran the series from May 26 to August 29, 2014, and again on Sunday afternoons from January 4 to August 30, 2015.
Decades re-ran part of the series on February 24–25, 2018, and again on January 30–31, 2021, for their binge weekend programming block. Mod Squad was being shown on MeTv+ late in 2021.

Related productions
A television pilot was shot in 1968, with a running time of 74 minutes, but it was never aired in its entirety. The film was edited to 50 minutes and aired as the show's first episode. The uncut 74-minute version appears on the DVD set as the opening episode, with the title "The Teeth of the Barracuda."

A TV reunion movie, The Return of the Mod Squad, was transmitted on ABC on May 18, 1979, featuring the entire original cast. Tom Bosley, a guest star during the original run, also participated as an antagonist targeting Julie Barnes herself. Peggy Lipton said she participated in it as a favor to Aaron Spelling.

In 1999, the series was adapted into a feature film with the same title by MGM; however, this film, which starred Giovanni Ribisi, Omar Epps, Claire Danes, and Dennis Farina reprising Cole's, Williams III's, Lipton's, and Andrews's roles respectively, was not a box-office success.

Home media
CBS DVD (distributed by Paramount) has released the first two seasons of The Mod Squad on DVD in Region 1.

On August 20, 2013, it was announced that Visual Entertainment had acquired the rights to the series (under license from Paramount) and would release season 3 on DVD on September 24, 2013. Season 4 would be released on October 1, 2013. In Canada, Season 3 was released on DVD a week earlier, on September 17, 2013, and Season 4 was released on October 8, 2013. Season 5 was released in Canada on November 19, 2013 and in the US on December 17, 2013. A complete series set was released in Canada and the US on November 12, 2013.

References elsewhere in popular culture

The term "Mod Squad" had been introduced the previous year in Dragnet 1967's sixteenth installment, "The Big Kids," where it described a club of high schoolers who had to shoplift at least $20 to become members.

In 1990 on the TV series Twin Peaks, in which Lipton was a regular, Williams appeared in two episodes. The pair shared a brief scene that appears to have been an intentional reunion.

References

External links

 CBS Television Distribution Syndication Bible (including The Mod Squad)
 Mod Squad

1968 American television series debuts
1973 American television series endings
1960s American crime drama television series
1970s American crime drama television series
American Broadcasting Company original programming
Television shows adapted into films
Television shows set in Los Angeles
Television series by CBS Studios
Television series by Spelling Television
English-language television shows
American detective television series